is a fictional character who appears in the Sword Art Online series of light novels by Reki Kawahara. She is mononymously more commonly known as just , her player name in the eponymous video game which the novels are set in. Asuna appears as the lover of Kirito; as well as the female lead, she is in the novels a sub-leader of the  guild, notable for being the strongest guild in Aincrad. She is depicted as having earned a reputation as a skilled player in-game, giving her the nickname , which, coupled with her physical attractiveness, have made her well-known and sought after by other players.

Both Asuna and Kirito have become popular characters in anime and manga fandom, frequently appearing on lists of the most popular anime characters. Additionally, Asuna has featured in numerous official Sword Art Online merchandise, and has been the subject of mixed to mostly positive critical reception, with focus on her relationship with Kirito, attractiveness, and role in the series.

Creation and conception

In an interview with series creator Reki Kawahara, the author noted that the female characters in Sword Art Online were not based on anyone he knew in the real world, with him stating "I don’t usually make a character, setting, or anything before I start writing. As I write the story, the girls become what they are now. So, somehow, I don’t know exactly, but somehow, my subliminal idea or some hidden emotion creates the characters to be strong and capable." Kawahara also added that he wrote the series to demonstrate that he views online gaming not as a social ill or escape from real life, and thus decided to show games in a more positive light in his light novels. In another interview with Anime News Network, interviewer Lynzee Loveridge noted that Asuna is a "very strong, capable female character", likening her to Genji's mother in The Tale of Genji, to which Kawahara agreed.

At Sakura-Con 2013, Kawahara noted that "the character of Asuna I might have created a little too perfectly for Sword Art Online. When teamed up with Kirito, there were hardly any problems the two as a pair could not overcome", in response to whether Asuna was a "tricky character" to develop. In an interview with Haruka Tomatsu, Asuna's voice actor, she said that "rather than having something similar to her, I feel that to me, she is the ideal person that I would want to become. After all, she can cook, she's smart... I think that she's the type of woman I wanted to become and admired. Leaving aside if I can cook well, though, I really like to cook. I don't really know if I can say if we are alike because of that, though."

Abilities
 is Asuna's signature one-handed rapier. She continued to use it as her main weapon of choice until the fateful battle on the 75th Floor. Kirito used this rapier to stab and defeat Heathcliff in the final battle, thus clearing the game. Her rapier, combined with her speed, earned her the nickname "Lightning Flash.”

Appearances

The main heroine of Sword Art Online and main protagonist of the seventh volume, Asuna is a friend and later to be wife of Kirito and a sub-leader of the "Knights of the Blood Oath", a medium-sized guild acknowledged as the strongest guild in Aincrad. Being one of the few girls that play SAO and extremely attractive, she receives many invitations and proposals. Asuna is a strong-willed, accomplished player known in-game as the "Flash" for her extraordinary fast sword skill. Later, she falls in love with Kirito and they marry in-game. Towards the end of the SAO arc, she saves Kirito from a killing blow by Heathcliff at the cost of her life. However, her death was only in-game and she is shortly reunited with Kirito shortly after the death of Heathcliff.

Despite the completion of SAO, Asuna remains unconscious and is instead detained in another virtual reality called Alfheim Online. She is forced to play the role of "Titania the Queen of Fairies", with Nobuyuki Sugō, the man responsible for imprisoning her, playing as Oberon the Fairy King. This is done so that Sugō could marry Asuna in the real world, while she is unconscious and thus take over RCT Progress Inc. She attempts to escape the World Tree where she is imprisoned and manages to steal a GM card which she throws out of the window when she hears Yui's voice. Upon being released she creates two avatars for Alfheim, Asuna (being the healer of the team) and Erika (a battle-type avatar), and went on to continue living together with Kirito. She enrolls at the SAO Survivor School with Kazuto Kirigaya in the real world after everything ended. In the real world, Asuna's parents want her to follow in their footsteps. However, after living in SAO and meeting Kirito, she gains a different perspective and looks back on her past with disgust. She officially becomes Kazuto's real-life girlfriend and dreams of marrying him and having a family with him in the future.

Reception

Critical commentary

In a review, Richard Eisenbeis of Kotaku hailed Sword Art Online as the smartest series in recent years; Eisenbeis particularly noted how the romance between Kirito and Asuna is explored bringing "definition to exactly what love is like in a virtual world." However, in the second half of the novels, criticism was levied at the aspect of turning Asuna into a damsel in distress trope, stating that a strong female lead was "reduced to nothing but the quest item the male lead is hunting for." Eisenbeis further complained that "in the first arc of Sword Art Online, Asuna was a strong fighter and one of the leaders who thousands depended on to get them through the death game alive. In the second arc, she was powerless, locked in a literal bird cage and molested by her captor while waiting for her hero to rescue her. In Gun Gale Online, she was little more than a spectator cheering on her man. And even in Calibre, she was just another member of the ensemble cast."

Responding to this criticism, Karen Mead of Japanator.com disagreed, writing that "in Asuna's case, her actions are instrumental to her own rescue; if she hadn't broken out of her cell and gone exploring late in the show, Kirito wouldn't have gotten the card he needed to get to where she was and rescue her", thus invalidating her role as a damsel in distress technically, though the criticism itself was still seen as valid. The claim that Kirito serves as a "Gary Stu" type character was also contested, citing his relationship with Asuna. Nevertheless, Eisenbeis praised the fourth arc of Sword Art Online as it focuses primarily on Asuna's point of view – an "excellent choice" in his opinion, as it "allows Asuna, who suddenly went from strong female lead to weak damsel in distress in the series’ second arc, to once again come into her own and develop as a character." The arc as a whole was called "both heartbreaking and beautiful."

Popularity

Asuna is one of the most popular characters in Sword Art Online. In a fan poll by anime website Charapedia, 10,000 respondents voted on their favourite couples in anime, with Asuna and Kirito topping the list. Kirito's confession to Asuna also placed third in a list of the top twenty "anime and manga love confessions" by the same website. A third Charapedia poll, which asked fans to list their favourite "cool" women in anime, had Asuna placed second with 525 votes. A fourth, which users listed the "top 20 female anime/manga characters not to provoke", had Asuna listed in third place. A fifth, where respondents ranked the "top 30 [anime] characters they’d like to work for", had Kirito placed twenty-ninth and Asuna twenty-sixth. Yet in another Charapedia poll, "Asuna" was first on a list of the "top 20 anime characters Japanese fans would name their children after"; "Kazuto" (Kirito) placed fourth. A Chinese website, bilibili, took a reader poll to find the most "moe" characters of 2015; Asuna winning the female third place and Kirito listed in the male top 8. Asuna and Kirito were awarded first and second respectively in a character poll by Dengeki Bunko (the publisher of Sword Art Online) for their light novels. Additionally, Asuna scored first place in a Tokyo Otaku Mode survey where users polled which anime characters they most want to date, where 2,845 respondents from 100 countries participated.

Kirito and Asuna again made a list of the "[Top] 7 Couples Who Make Love and War" by Anime News Network, writing "love blossoms on the virtual battlefield and the two wed before taking on the game's creator together. Otamart, a popular Japanese app that specializes in anime, manga and idol products, polled users in which characters look best in swimsuits and yukatas, with Asuna placing 13th (for swimsuits) and 15th (for yukatas) respectively. Another Otamart poll asking users to rank the anime characters they would want to give chocolates to for Valentine's Day had Asuna placed both 10th on characters men wish to give chocolates to and men wish to receive chocolates from. The August 2014 issue of Newtype published results of a recent character popularity poll, with Asuna placing 4th for all female characters (Kirito placed 1st in the male character category). Asuna was ranked the eighth "Top 25 Hottest Anime Babes [of] 2013." Italian restaurant La Ricetta in Zama, Kanagawa features pancakes prepared with anime and video game character art, including Kirito and Asuna.

Merchandise

The character has received positive critical reception, and her popularity has led to her being featured in several promotional efforts or merchandise of the series. This includes two swimsuit figures of Asuna and Leafa, another character from Sword Art Online. There is also a "cooking version" figurine of Asuna, which is set for a May 2016 release. She also features in promotional advertisements for a series of Umaibo puffed corn snacks by Namco. An interactive digital assistant app titled "Wake Me Up Asuna", in which Asuna provides the user with information such as wake-up calls, current weather, fortune, and appointments, was released in June 2015 in Japan, followed by an international release in English. In the app, Asuna herself appears in multiple costumes, including her Knights of the Blood uniform and a yellow sweater. The app itself is free though users have to pay for English voice recognition and subtitles.

Sword Art Online girls (including Asuna) feature in a merchandise lottery by Bandai, with Anime News Network humorously noting that "the girls of Sword Art Online have brought in a pretty penny for the franchise's creators, whether the characters are lounging under parasols or starring in their own manga spin-off." Replicas of Asuna's "Wind Fleuret" and Kirito's "Elucidator" rapiers have been built. There are also Kirito, Asuna, and Sinon Sword Art Online-branded perfumes for sale; "Asuna" is described as " a sweet, irresistibly refreshing scent of galbanum and jasmine." Sword Art Online glasses based on the characters had a "Fairy Dance Asuna" model "inspired by [her] time in Yggdrasil, the World Tree", and "these glasses have pale pink frames with a red ribbon and flowing hair depicted on each arm." There are also earphone jack figures of Asuna (in both regular and Titania versions), Leafa, and Suguha. Asuna has featured in several Sword Art Online-related video games. This includes Dengeki Bunko: Fighting Climax, in which several characters appearing under the Dengeki Bunko imprint are featured. Asuna, Kirito and Leafa appeared in a campaign by the "Manga Anime Guardians" project in combating anime and manga piracy, with the being project supported by 15 anime production studios and manga publishers.

References

External links
Characters at the Sword Art Online official Japanese website
Characters at the Sword Art Online official North American website
Asuna at IMDb

Literary characters introduced in 2009
Female characters in anime and manga
Fictional female swordfighters
Fictional fencers
Fictional gentry
Fictional Japanese people in anime and manga
Fictional swordfighters in anime and manga
Teenage characters in anime and manga
Female soldier and warrior characters in anime and manga
Sword Art Online characters
Martial artist characters in anime and manga